Homidia socia is a species of slender springtail in the family Entomobryidae.

References

Entomobryomorpha
Articles created by Qbugbot
Animals described in 1929